Land Girls or variants may refer to:

Women's Land Army (World War II)
Women's Land Army (World War I)
The Land Girls, a 1998 film 
Land Girls (TV series), 2009